Little Sandy Bottom Pond is a  pond in Pembroke, Massachusetts, in the Bryantville section of town. The pond is a Class A tributary to Great Sandy Bottom Pond, a public water supply for the Abington/Rockland Joint Water Works.

External links
Environment Protection Agency
South Shore Coastal Watersheds - Lake Assessments

Ponds of Plymouth County, Massachusetts
Pembroke, Massachusetts
Ponds of Massachusetts